Ajaccio Napoleon Bonaparte Airport, formerly "Campo dell'Oro Airport", is the main airport serving Ajaccio on the French island of Corsica in the Mediterranean Sea. The airport is the main base of regional airline Air Corsica, which operates services to continental France. It is named for Napoleon Bonaparte, who was born in Ajaccio.

History
Campo dell'Oro, before aviation, was an alluvial plain at the mouth of the Gravona. The toponym's origin, meaning "Field of Gold", remains obscure; some 19th century authors refer to a "rich cropland"; others, to a malaria-infested marshland. A grass flying field existed there before World War II but apparently offered no transportation services, as the first regular flights to Marseille began with the institution of a seaplane service in 1935 from Ajaccio Harbor.

In 1940, a Vichy Air Corps unit was kept inactive at Campo dell'Oro. The liberation of Corsica began with the landing by sea in 1943 of I Corps at Ajaccio in Operation Vésuve. A few months later Fighter Group GC2/7 of the Free French Air Force, a French unit of the Royal Air Force, were operational on the grass field at Campo dell'Oro with Spitfires. Heavy aircraft were unable to land and came to mishap in the soft surface.

In 1944 the United States Army Air Forces took over the airport and put down a hard surface of perforated metallic mats from which a squadron of P-51s flew. They defended B-26s flying from new airfields constructed on the east coast of Corsica. Campo dell'Oro was a challenge for the larger aircraft because of its relatively short runways and proximity to the mountains. Toward the end of the war, the runways were paved, forming the foundation of the modern airport.

Airlines and destinations
The following airlines operate regular scheduled and charter flights at Ajaccio Napoleon Bonaparte Airport:

Statistics

Other facilities
Air Corsica has its head office on the airport property.

Incidents and accidents 
 On 1 December 1981, Inex-Adria Aviopromet Flight 1308 crashed while on approach to this airport, killing all on board.

References

External links

 Ajaccio Airport CCI Ajaccio et Corse-du-Sud 
 Aéroport d'Ajaccio Napoléon Bonaparte – Union des Aéroports Français 
 
 

Airports in Corsica
Airport
Buildings and structures in Corse-du-Sud